Anguilla is an island in the Leeward Islands.  It has  numerous bays, including Barnes, Little, Rendezvous, Shoal, and Road Bays.

Statistics 
Location: Caribbean, island in the Caribbean Sea, east of Puerto Rico

Geographic coordinates: 18°15′ N, 63°10′ W

Map references: Central America and the Caribbean

Area:
total: 
land: 
water: 

Area – comparative: about half the size of Washington, D.C.

Coastline: 61 km

Maritime claims:
exclusive fishing zone: 
territorial sea: 

Climate: tropical moderated by northeast trade winds

Terrain: flat and low-lying island of coral and limestone

Elevation extremes:
lowest point: Caribbean Sea 0 m
highest point: Crocus Hill 73 m

Natural resources: salt, fish, lobster

Land use:
arable land: 0%
permanent crops: 0%
permanent pastures: 0%
forests and woodland: 61.1%
other: 38.9% (mostly rock with some commercial salt ponds)

Natural hazards: frequent hurricanes and other tropical
storms (July to October)

Environment – current issues: supplies of potable water
sometimes cannot meet increasing demand largely because of poor distribution system.

Islands and cays

The territory of Anguilla consists of the island of Anguilla itself (by far the largest), as well as numerous other islands and cays, most of which are very small and uninhabited. These include:

 Anguillita
 Blowing Rock
 Cove Cay
 Crocus Cay
 Deadman's Cay
 Dog Island
 East Cay
 Little Island
 Little Scrub Island
 Mid Cay
 North Cay
 Prickly Pear Cays
 Rabbit Island
 Sandy Island, also known as Sand Island
 Scilly Cay
 Scrub Island
 Seal Island
 Sombrero, also known as Hat Island
 South Cay
 South Wager Island
 West Cay

Districts
Anguilla is divided into fourteen districts:

Climate
Anguilla features a tropical wet and dry climate under the Köppen climate classification. The island has a rather dry climate, moderated by northeast trade winds. Temperatures vary little throughout the year. Anguilla is vulnerable to hurricanes from June to November, peak season August to mid-October.
The island suffered damage in 1995 from Hurricane Luis.

Vegetation
Anguilla's coral and limestone terrain provide no subsistence possibilities for forests, woodland, pastures, crops, or arable lands. Its dry climate and thin soil hamper commercial agricultural development.

See also

References

External links
 Caribbean-On-Line.com provides detailed maps of Anguilla.
 Districts of Anguilla, Statoids.com
 Anguilla 2001 Census, Government of Anguilla